Danger Mouse is an animated television series, produced by FremantleMedia and Boulder Media, though it started being produced by Boat Rocker Media in 2018 after they acquired FremantleMedia Kids & Family. The series, which is a revival of the 1981 television series of the same name, revolves around Danger Mouse, the self-proclaimed "World's Greatest Secret Agent", and his hamster sidekick Penfold, who protect the world from a variety of dangers. With help from his boss Colonel K and the genius scientist Professor Squawkencluck, Danger Mouse is equipped to defeat his nemesis, Baron Silas von Greenback.

Plans for a revival of Danger Mouse were first considered in 2013, before being announced the following year, with original series co-creator Brian Cosgrove helping to develop the series. The main cast were announced in 2014, with more cast members being announced later in the year. The series premiered on CBBC on 28 September 2015, more than 20 years after the end of the show's original run.

Within three weeks of the series running, Danger Mouse achieved 2.4 million viewers and became the highest rated show on the CBBC channel. On 19 May 2016, the series was commissioned for a second series and on 4 April 2017, for a third series of 26 episodes.

Danger Mouse was the winner of the 'Best Sound Design' and 'Best Music' awards at the 2017 and 2019 Irish Animation Awards. 
Aidan McAteer also picked up the award for 'Best Director' at the 2019 awards.

Production
In 2013, FremantleMedia confirmed to Broadcast that an updated version of the series was being considered, and in June 2014 it was announced that a new series consisting of 52 episodes; was being made for broadcast on CBBC in 2015. The series is produced by Boulder Media for Boat Rocker Media, who acquired FremantleMedia's kids and family entertainment business in January 2018.

It is directed by Robert Cullen, with Brian Cosgrove, one of the original creators, as a creative consultant. Alexander Armstrong and Kevin Eldon voice Danger Mouse and Penfold, Dave Lamb takes the role of the narrator, whilst Stephen Fry and Ed Gaughan take on the roles of Colonel K and Baron Greenback respectively. Armstrong's Pointless co-host Richard Osman also appears in the series as Professor Strontium Jellyfishowitz. It was also announced that John Oliver would voice Dr Augustus P. Crumhorn IV and Lena Headey would voice new character Jeopardy Mouse. According to Eldon, the animation style is 'much the same as the original'. The series is animated in Toon Boom Harmony, as the animators thought that Flash was too limited.

The series was picked up by Netflix in several countries, including the United States. In August 2019, CBS All Access acquired the US streaming rights to the series.

Characters

Main characters
 Danger Mouse (voiced by Alexander Armstrong): The main protagonist and title character, Danger Mouse is the world's greatest secret agent. Supremely confident in his abilities, Danger Mouse can be narcissistic, which sometimes leads him to take actions that create risky situations. 
 Ernest Penfold (voiced by Kevin Eldon): A hamster who works as Danger Mouse's assistant and is his best friend. A timid and neurotic boy, he is often known for shouting "Oh, Crumbs!" when frightened. This version is not as misinterpretive as his original counterpart.
 Colonel K (voiced by Stephen Fry): A chinchilla who serves as Danger Mouse and Penfold's boss. In the episode "The Return of Danger K", it is revealed that the Colonel was once an agent himself called Danger K. A running gag is he either forgets Penfold's name or who he is. His beard and moustache is a sentient lifeform and now and then detaches itself from his face.
 Professor Squawkencluck (voiced by Shauna Macdonald): A chicken who is head scientist of the secret service and Danger Mouse's love interest. She does however get angered by Danger Mouse's devil-may-care attitude, the fact he uses her inventions without permission and when he breaks her latest creation, to the point of a love–hate relationship with him. Revealed in "The World Is Full of Stuff" to be Danger Mouse's future wife. Whether she is any relation to the original series' Prof. Heinrich von Squawkencluck has not as yet been revealed (even though the original Squawkencluck was a mole).
 Baron Silas von Greenback (voiced by Ed Gaughan): The main antagonist, a criminal mastermind and Danger Mouse's archenemy. Though Greenback was a mainstay of the 1981 series, in the 2015 series, the prefix "von" (which had previously been incorporated briefly in "Chicken Run", an episode of the original series) has been incorporated into his name. He is given a German accent to match.
 Nero (vocal effects by Marc Silk): Greenback's pet fluffy white caterpillar, whose intelligence and duplicity is often underestimated.
 Stiletto Mafiosa (voiced by Dave Lamb): Greenback's dim-witted Italian crow sidekick.
 The Narrator (voice of Lamb): As with the original series, The Narrator, an unseen character, frequently breaks the fourth wall, interacting with both the viewer and the other characters and often finds himself in danger from the episode's antagonist.

Recurring characters
 Pandaminion (voiced by Gaughan): A panda and Greenback's newest unintelligent minion.
 Dr. Loo-cifer (née John) (voiced by Kayvan Novak): An advanced robotic toilet gone rogue.
 "Pink" Dawn Crumhorn/The Princess (voiced by Morwenna Banks): A young spoiled poodle who becomes powerful after her tiara comes into contact with personality-amplifying mind gel. She is later revealed to be the daughter of Doctor Augustus P. Crumhorn IV (and thus, the granddaughter of the original Crumhorn) in "Mousefall".
 Isambard King Kong Brunel (voiced by Novak): A scientist monkey who comes up with impractical inventions. He once created a time machine to replace all useful inventions with his own. He is a parody of Isambard Kingdom Brunel, a well-known pioneer of engineering, and former chief mechanical engineer of the Great Western Railway.
 Quark (voiced by Gaughan): A money-hungry alien huckster who tries to use DM in get-rich-quick schemes.
 The Snowman (voiced by Richard Ayoade): An embarrassingly inept living snowman with the ability to freeze things with his left arm and fire explosive carrots from his nose.
 Count Duckula (voiced by Rasmus Hardiker): A stardom-obsessed vampire duck. This depiction of the character combines aspects of both his villainous counterpart from the original Danger Mouse series, and his more amicable vegetarian counterpart from his own spin-off series.  This Count Duckula affirmatively identifies himself as a vegetarian, but also possesses natural fangs and permanent red eyes.  He does not display any of the two previous depictions' magical abilities, but is shown to perfectly tolerate sunlight, such that it has no ill effect.
 Baron Silas von Penfold (voiced by Eldon): An evil version of Penfold from an alternate reality known as the Twystyverse. He is often seen working alongside his enforcer,  Sinister Mouse, as that dimension's greatest supervillains.
Sinister Mouse (voiced by Armstrong): The world's greatest Evil Agent and DM's doppelganger from the Twystyverse.
 The Queen of Weevils (voiced by Miranda Richardson): An evil beetle witch from Arthurian Legend, who was sealed away inside a gem over a thousand years ago by Merlin before accidentally being released by DM into the modern world.
 The Queen (voiced by Banks): The Queen of the UK. Her depiction as a corgi is a reference to them being kept as pets by the Queen in real life.
 Jeopardy Mouse (voiced by Lena Headey): The female American equivalent of Danger Mouse. Clad in a slick military jumpsuit and working under orders from General E. Normous Schwartznut, she performs her missions professionally and without fuss—but has a tendency to be overbearing and take herself too seriously.
 Doctor Augustus P. Crumhorn IV (voiced by John Oliver): The father of The Princess and the son of Doctor Augustus P. Crumhorn III, he is an ambitious trillionaire Dobermann Pinscher who vows to defeat Danger Mouse in order to make his daughter happy and buy up all the companies in the world. He is completely different from Augustus P Crumhorn III who was a mad scientist.

Episodes

Home media

Video games 
In July 2017, it was announced that an official Danger Mouse mobile game was in development by 9th Impact and the game Danger Mouse: The Danger Games was released on iOS App Store and Google Play Store in August 2017.  The game is a multiplayer racing battle with card trading.
It was nominated for Best Mobile Game at the 2017 Best of Gamescom awards, but lost to Metroid: Samus Returns. It was also nominated for "Best Racing Game" at The Independent Game Developers' Association Awards 2018, but lost to F1 2017.

The game was also released for the Nintendo Switch on September 13, 2018.

DVD releases
The first DVD of the series was released on 2 November 2015. The whole of series 1 has been released across 6 DVDs, with 1 being released in 2015, 2 in 2016 and 3 in 2017. All 2015 episodes have been released for digital download through Amazon and other services.

Stage adaptation
It was announced in December 2016 that there would be a live stage show based on the TV series in 2017. The show is being produced by FremantleMedia who created the series for CBBC and is also produced by Butlins holiday park where it toured around all three of its parks from Easter 2017 until January 2018. The show is titled Robo Mop. The stage show returned in 2018.

Merchandising
Jazwares is the master toy partner, Penguin Books publish a range of printed books, including story books, official guides, sticker books, novelty books, annuals and electronic titles and D.C. Thomson & Co. have started publishing a monthly magazine (from July 2016) with comic strips, puzzles, fact files, poster and competitions. Marc Silk read Danger Mouse audiobooks, the first one being released on 2 June 2016. A Danger Mouse Scribble Book was also released on 2 June 2016, as well as Sticky Situations! Colouring Book and License to Chill.

Notes

References

External links
 
 
 Danger Mouse: The Danger Games on Google Play Store
 Danger Mouse: The Danger Games on App Store

Danger Mouse
2015 British television series debuts
2010s British animated television series
2018 Canadian television series debuts
2019 Canadian television series endings
2010s Canadian animated television series
British children's animated action television series
British children's animated adventure television series
British children's animated comic science fiction television series
British children's animated superhero television series
Canadian children's animated action television series
Canadian children's animated adventure television series
Canadian children's animated comic science fiction television series
Canadian children's animated superhero television series
CBBC shows
English-language television shows
Espionage television series
Television series by FremantleMedia Kids & Family
Television series by Boat Rocker Media
Fictional secret agents and spies
Animated television series reboots
Animated television series about mice and rats
Television shows set in London